Clavulina amethystinoides is a species of fungus in the family Clavulinaceae. It was originally named Clavaria amethystinoides by American mycologist Charles Horton Peck in 1907; E.J.H. Corner transferred it to Clavulina in 1950.

References

External links

Mushroom Expert

Fungi described in 1907
Fungi of North America
amethystinoides